Phytoecia affinis is a species of beetle in the family Cerambycidae. It was described by Harrer in 1784, originally under the genus Leptura. It has a wide distribution in Europe.

Subspecies
 Phytoecia affinis boeberi Ganglbauer, 1883
 Phytoecia affinis nigropubescens Reitter, 1888
 Phytoecia affinis altaica Suvorov, 1913
 Phytoecia affinis volgensis Kraatz, 1883
 Phytoecia affinis tuerki Ganglbauer, 1883
 Phytoecia affinis affinis (Harrer, 1784)

References

Phytoecia
Beetles described in 1784